Amazonite, also known as Amazonstone, is a green tectosilicate mineral, a variety of the potassium feldspar called microcline. Its chemical formula is KAlSi3O8, which is polymorphic to orthoclase.

Its name is taken from that of the Amazon River, from which green stones were formerly obtained, though it is unknown whether those stones were amazonite. Although it has been used for over two thousand years, as attested by archaeological finds in Egypt and Mesopotamia, no ancient or medieval authority mentions it. It was first described as a distinct mineral only in the 18th century.

Green and greenish-blue varieties of potassium feldspars that are predominantly triclinic are designated
as amazonite. It has been described as a "beautiful crystallized variety of a bright verdigris-green" and as possessing a "lively green colour." It is occasionally cut and used as a gemstone.

Occurrence 

Amazonite is a mineral of limited occurrence. Formerly it was obtained almost exclusively from the area of Miass in the Ilmensky Mountains, 50 miles southwest of Chelyabinsk, Russia, where it occurs in granitic rocks. 

Amazonite is now known to occur in various places around the globe. Those places are, among others, as follows:

China:
 Baishitouquan granite intrusion, Hami Prefecture, Xinjiang: found in granite
Libya:
 Jabal Eghei, Tibesti Mountains: found in granitic rocks
Mongolia:
 Avdar Massif, Töv Province: found in alkali granite

South Africa:

 Mogalakwena, Limpopo Province
 Khâi-Ma, Northern Cape
 Kakamas, Northern Cape
 Ceres Valley, Western Cape

Sweden:
Skuleboda mine, Västra Götaland County: found in pegmatite

United States:
 Colorado:
 Deer Trail, Arapahoe County:233
 Custer County:234
 Devils Head, Douglas County:234
 Pine Creek, Douglas County:234
 Crystal Park, El Paso County:234
 Pikes Peak, El Paso County: found in coarse granites or pegmatite
 St. Peter's Dome, El Paso County:234
 Tarryall Mountains, Park County:235
 Crystal Peak, Teller County:235
 Virginia:
 Morefield Mine, Amelia County: found in pegmatite
 Rutherford Mine, Amelia County
 Pennsylvania:
 Media, Delaware County:244
 Middletown, Delaware County:244

Color 

For many years, the source of amazonite's color was a mystery. Some people assumed the color was due to copper because copper compounds often have blue and green colors. A 1985 study suggests that the blue-green color results from quantities of lead and water in the feldspar. Subsequent 1998 theoretical studies by A. Julg expand on the potential role of aliovalent lead in the color of microcline.

Other studies suggest the colors are associated with the increasing content of lead, rubidium, and thallium ranging in amounts between 0.00X and 0.0X in the feldspars, with even extremely high contents of PbO, lead monoxide, (1% or more) known from the literature. A 2010 study also implicated the role of divalent iron in the green coloration. These studies and associated hypotheses indicate the complex nature of the color in amazonite; in other words, the color may be the aggregate effect of several mutually inclusive and necessary factors.

Health 
A 2021 study by the German Institut für Edelsteinprüfung (EPI) found that the amount of lead that leaked from an  sample of Amazonite into an acidic solution simulating saliva exceeded European Union standard DIN EN 71-3:2013's recommended amount by five times. This experiment was to simulate a child swallowing Amazonite, and could also apply to new wellness practices such as inserting the mineral into oils or drinking water for days.

Gallery

References

Further reading

External links 

Feldspar
Gemstones